The Journal of the American Podiatric Medical Association is a bimonthly peer-reviewed academic journal covering podiatry, including foot and ankle surgery, biomechanics, and dermatology. It was established in 1907 and is the official journal of the American Podiatric Medical Association. The editor-in-chief is Warren R. Joseph.

Abstracting and indexing
The journal is abstracted and indexed in:
 Index medicus/MEDLINE/PubMed
 Current Contents/Life Sciences
Science Citation Index Expanded
According to the Journal Citation Reports, the journal has a 2013 impact factor of 0.574.

References

External links
 

Podiatry
Orthopedics journals
Bimonthly journals
English-language journals
Publications established in 1907
Academic journals published by learned and professional societies of the United States